Transstadial transmission occurs when a pathogen remains with the vector from one life stage ("stadium") to the next. For example, the bacteria Borrelia burgdorferi, the causative agent for Lyme disease, infects the tick vector as a larva, and the infection is maintained when it molts to a nymph and later develops as an adult. This type of transmission is seen in other parasites like viruses or Rickettsia. In addition to ticks, mites are another common vector.  Some sources consider transstadial transmission a type of horizontal transmission, whereas other sources consider it vertical or partial vertical transmission.

Transstadial blockage could be considered the opposite of transstadial transmission, where the parasite cannot be carried over from one life stage to the next. For example, viruses that undergo transstadial blockage will have decreased infectivity in molting insects.

See also
Transovarial transmission

References

Parasitology
Epidemiology